Cauque mauleanum is a species of fish in the family Atherinidae. It is endemic to Chile.

Sources
 

Cauque
Freshwater fish of Chile
Taxonomy articles created by Polbot
Taxobox binomials not recognized by IUCN